Amtala Annadamani Balika Vidyalaya  is a secondary and higher secondary educational high school located in Amtala, Naoda, Murshidabad, India.

See also
Amtala High School

References

Girls' schools in West Bengal
High schools and secondary schools in West Bengal
Schools in Murshidabad district
Educational institutions established in 1970
1970 establishments in West Bengal